Gagik Khachatryan (born October 25, 1971 in Pshatavan, Armenian SSR) is an Armenian retired weightlifter. He competed at the 2000 Summer Olympics in the men's 85 kg division. He competed at world championships, most recently at the 2001 World Weightlifting Championships.

Major results

References

External links

1971 births
Living people
People from Pshatavan
Armenian male weightlifters
Olympic weightlifters of Armenia
Weightlifters at the 2000 Summer Olympics